The Long Loneliness is the autobiography of Dorothy Day, published in 1952 by Harper & Brothers. In the book, Day chronicles her involvement in socialist groups along with her eventual conversion to Catholicism in 1927, and the beginning of her newspaper the Catholic Worker in 1933.

It has been characterized as "a remarkably candid account, without piety, of her journey to faith". A 1952 review in The New York Times focused on her interactions with communism and her journey away from it while staying true to her radical roots: "This book will not shock anybody. It may touch many, whatever their secular or religious faith, who lament the kindliness and sympathy that Communists found among certain left-wing groups -- and betrayed."

List of people and publications
The following is a list of prayers, people, and publications mentioned in the book until the end of the chapter "The Masses":

Prayers 

 Confiteor
 Benedicite
 Te Deum

People 

 Augustine of Hippo (St. Augustine)
 Peter Maurin
 Fred Ellis (cartoonist)
 Francis de Sales (St. Francis de Sales)
 G. K. Chesterton
 Mary Harrington
 Mrs. Barrett
 Virgil (Vergil)
 Xenophon
 Alfred, Lord Tennyson
 Fyodor Dostoevsky (Dostoevski)
 Carl Sandburg
 Eugene V. Debs
 Jack London
 Upton Sinclair
 Frank Harris
 Peter Kropotkin
 Vera Figner
 Karl Marx
 Maxim Gorky (Gorki)
 Leo Tolstoy (Tolstoi)
 Jesus
 Rayna Prohme (Rayna Simons)
 Vincent Sheean
 Samson Raphaelson (Raph)
 Rose Pastor Stokes
 Scott Nearing
 John Masefield
 Edgar Lee Masters
 Charles Baudelaire
 Francesc Ferrer i Guàrdia (Francisco Ferrer)
 William Godwin
 Pierre-Joseph Proudhon
 Eric Gill
 Vincent McNabb
 Hilaire Belloc
 Emma Goldman
 Alexander Berkman
François Mauriac
Hypolite Havel
Robert Minor
Charles Ashleigh
Leon Trotsky
Ludwig Lore
Elizabeth Gurley Flynn
Max Eastman
Floyd Dell
Merrill Rogers
John Reed (journalist) (Jack Reed)
Arturo Giovannitti
Art Young
Hugo Gellert
Boardman Robinson
Maurice Becker
Henry Glintencamp
Mike Gold
Edna Kenton
David Karb
Brian Oswald Donn-Byrne (Donn Byrne)
Hi Moderwell

Publications 

 Demons (Dostoevsky novel) (The Possessed)
 Daily Worker
 Ecclesiastes
 Bible
 Psalms
 Psalm 119
 The Saturday Evening Post
 Science and Health with Key to the Scriptures
 Chicago Inter Ocean
 Georgics
 Eclogues (Bucolics)
 The Day Book
 Martin Eden
 The Jungle
 The Mystery of Love by Upton Sinclair
 Personal History by Vincent Sheean
 Tommy and Grizel by J. M. Barrie
 The Morning Telegraph
 New York Call
 The Harbor by Ernest Poole
 Industrial Worker
 Fields, Factories and Workshops
 Mutual Aid: A Factor of Evolution
 The Conquest of Bread
 The Philosophy of Poverty by Pierre-Joseph Proudhon
 The Poverty of Philosophy
 The Un-Marxian Socialist by Henri de Lubac
 What Is Property?
 Memoirs of a Revolutionist
 The Atlantic (Atlantic Monthly)
 Mother Earth (magazine)
Living My Life
Rerum Novarum
Novy Mir (1916 magazine)
Leipziger Volkszeitung
The Masses
Pearson's Magazine
Ten Days That Shook the World

References

External links
The Catholic Worker Movement

Political autobiographies
1952 non-fiction books
Catholic Worker Movement
Harper & Brothers books
Dorothy Day